Taharom Dasht (also Romanized as Ţahārom Dasht; also known as Ţahārem, Ţahārom, and Ţārom Dasht) is a village in Shal Rural District, Shahrud District, Khalkhal County, Ardabil Province, Iran. At the 2006 census, its population was 124, in 45 families.

References 

Towns and villages in Khalkhal County